Arava, Aravah or Arabah may refer to:

Places
Arava, Estonia, a village in Anija Commune, Harju County, Estonia
Arava(h) (Hebrew) or Arabah (Arabic), a section of the Great Rift Valley between the Dead Sea and the Gulf of Aqaba in Israel and Jordan
Arava Stream, an intermittent stream 
Sea of Arava, the Dead Sea

Other uses
Arava Institute for Environmental Studies, an Israeli study programme
Arava Power Company, an Israeli solar energy company
Arava Shahaf (born 1990), Israeli footballer
Arava spider, a huntsman spider found in the southern Arava Valley of Israel and Jordan
Arava, a brand name for the antirheumatic drug leflunomide
IAI Arava, a plane manufactured by Israel Aircraft Industries
Aravah (Sukkot), a willow branch, one of the four species used on the Jewish holiday of Sukkot

See also
Arraba (disambiguation)
Araba (disambiguation)